Olearia angulata is a species of flowering plant in the family Asteraceae.
It is found only in New Zealand.

References

angulata
Flora of New Zealand
Data deficient plants
Taxonomy articles created by Polbot